was the fourth shōgun of the Tokugawa dynasty of Japan who was in office from 1651 to 1680. He is considered the eldest son of Tokugawa Iemitsu, which makes him the grandson of Tokugawa Hidetada and the great-grandson of Tokugawa Ieyasu.

Early life (1641–1651)
Tokugawa Ietsuna was born in 1641, allegedly the eldest son of Tokugawa Iemitsu with his concubine, Oraku no Kata later Houjuin. Later Ietsuna was raised with his sister, Chiyohime (born by Ofuri) by Iemitsu's concubine, Oman no kata (later Eikoin) and Iemitsu's wife, Takatsukasa Takako later Honriin. After Eikoin retired, Senhime (also called Tenjuin) raised him with Honriin. At that time his father was shogun in his own right and had enacted several anti-Christian measures after the bloody Shimabara Rebellion of 1637. Though the suppression of this rebellion quelled all serious threats to Tokugawa rule, it was nonetheless an unsure era. Ietsuna was a frail child, and this carried over into his adult years. Nothing else is known of his youth. His childhood name was Takechiyo (竹千代).

Family
Parents
 Father: Tokugawa Iemitsu (徳川 家光, August 12, 1604 – June 8, 1651) 
 Mother: Hōjuin (1621–1653)
 Adopted mother: Eiko'in (1624–1711)
 Consorts and Issue:
 Wife: Asa no Miya Akiko (1640–1676) later Koge'in
 Concubine: Ofuri no Kata (1649–1667) later Yoshun'in
 son (died in womb in 1667) 
 Concubine: Mitsuru no Kata (1660–1690) later Enmyō'in
daughter (died in womb in 1678)
 Concubine: Yoshino no Kata (d. 1680)
 son (died in womb in 1680)
 Concubine: Oyo no Kata (d. 1657)
 Concubine: Oshima no Kata (d. 1660)
 Concubine: Onatsu no Kata (d. 1680) later Honjuin
 Concubine: Okiku no Kata
 Concubine: Ofuji no Kata later Jokkoin
 Concubine: Okoto no Kata later Zumnyoin
 Concubine: Oran no Kata
 Concubine: Omino no Kata (d. 1679)
 Concubine: Osumi no Kata
Adopted daughter:
 Naohime, daughter of Tokugawa Mitsutomo

Shogunal regency (1651–1663)
Tokugawa Iemitsu died in early 1651, at the age of forty-seven. After his death, the Tokugawa dynasty was at major risk. Ietsuna, the heir, was only ten years old. Nonetheless, despite his age, Minamoto no Ietsuna became shogun in Kei'an 4 (1651). Until he came of age, five regents were to rule in his place, but Shogun Ietsuna nevertheless assumed a role as formal head of the bakufu bureaucracy.

In this period, regents exercised power in the shoguns name.  These were Sakai Tadakatsu, Sakai Tadakiyo, Inaba Masanori, Matsudaira Nobutsuna (a distant member of the Tokugawa), and one other. In addition to this regency, Iemitsu handpicked his half-brother, Hoshina Masayuki.

The first thing that Shogun Ietsuna and the regency had to address was the rōnin (masterless samurai). During the reign of Shogun Iemitsu, two samurai, Yui Shōsetsu and Marubashi Chūya, had been planning an uprising in which the city of Edo would be burned to the ground and, amidst the confusion, Edo Castle would be raided and the shōgun, other members of the Tokugawa and high officials would be executed. Similar occurrences would happen in Kyoto and Osaka. Shosetsu was himself of humble birth and he saw Toyotomi Hideyoshi as his idol.

Nonetheless, the plan was discovered after the death of Iemitsu, and Ietsuna's regents were brutal in suppressing the rebellion, which came to be known as the Keian Uprising or the "Tosa Conspiracy". Chuya was brutally executed along with his family and Shosetsu's family. Shosetsu chose to commit seppuku rather than being captured.

In 1652, about 800 rōnin led a small disturbance on Sado Island, and this was also brutally suppressed. But for the most part, the remainder of Ietsuna's rule was not disturbed anymore by the rōnin as the government became more civilian-oriented.

In Meireki 3 (1657), on the 18th–19th days of the 1st month, when Ietsuna was almost 20 years old, a great fire broke out in Edo and burned the city to the ground.  Ietsuna's concubine Oyo burned to death in the fire. It took two years to rebuild the city and bakufu officials supervised the rebuilding of the city. In 1659, Ietsuna presided over the opening ceremonies. In the 11th month he married Asa no Miya Akiko, daughter of Fushimi no Miya Sadakiyo. It is said that his relationship was quite good with Asa no Miya, though they didn't have a child; they adopted Naohime, daughter of Tokugawa Mitsutomo.

Bakufu power struggle (1663–1671)

In 1663, the regency for shōgun Ietsuna ended, but the regents still held power for him, the first time that the power behind the bakufu was not a former shōgun. Ietsuna's chief advisors were now Hoshina Masayuki, Ietsuna's uncle (whom he had deep regard for) Itakura Shigenori, Tsuchiya Kazunao, Kuze Hiroyuki, and Inaba Masanori. Even though Ietsuna was now ruling in his own right, these former regents now became his official advisors, and in some cases, acted for him. In some cases, however, Ietsuna acted upon his own accord, as when he came up with the idea of abolishing junshi, where a samurai follows his lord into death.

 1663 (Kanbun 3). The shogunate banned suicides due to fidelity (junshi).
 1669 (Kanbun 9). An Ainu rebellion broke out in Hokkaido.

Another example of this is in 1671 when the Date family of Sendai was involved in a succession dispute. The bakufu intervened and prevented another rendition of the Ōnin War. By 1671, however, many of the former regents were either dead or retired, and Ietsuna began to rule in his own right.

Shōgun (1671–1680)

Following the succession dispute of the Date, very few disturbances occurred for the remainder of Ietsuna's reign, except some defiant daimyōs.

In 1679, shōgun Ietsuna fell ill. His succession began to be discussed, in which Sakai Tadakiyo took an active role. He suggested that a son of Emperor Go-Sai become the next shogun, following the precedent of the later Kamakura shoguns, who in reality were members of the blood royal. Tadakiyo probably saw himself as becoming powerful like the Hōjō regents, and thus many members of the Tokugawa blood preferred Shogun Ietsuna's younger brother Tokugawa Tsunayoshi, also a son of Shogun Iemitsu, to become shōgun.

 June 4, 1680 (Enpō 8, 8th day of the 5th month): Shōgun Ietsuna dies; and he is succeeded as shogun by Tsunayoshi.

Tadakiyo retired, embarrassed, and shortly after, Tokugawa Ietsuna died in 1680.  His posthumous name was Genyū-in (厳有院) and was buried in Kan'ei-ji. He was succeeded by his younger brother, Tsunayoshi.

Though Ietsuna proved to be an able leader, affairs were largely controlled by the regents his father had appointed, even after Ietsuna was declared old enough to rule in his own right.

Eras of Ietsuna's bakufu
The years in which Ietsuna was shōgun are more specifically identified by more than one era name or nengō.
 Keian                 (1648–1652)
 Jōō      (1652–1655)
 Meireki               (1655–1658)
 Manji    (1658–1661)
 Kanbun  (1661–1673)
 Enpō            (1673–1681)

Ancestry

Notes

References
 Bodart-Bailey, Beatrice. (1999). Kaempfer's Japan: Tokugawa Culture Observed.  Honolulu:  University of Hawaii Press . ; ;   OCLC 246417677
 Nussbaum, Louis Frédéric and Käthe Roth. (2005). Japan Encyclopedia. Cambridge: Harvard University Press. ; OCLC 48943301
 Screech, Timon. (2006). Secret Memoirs of the Shoguns: Isaac Titsingh and Japan, 1779–1822. London: RoutledgeCurzon. ; OCLC 65177072
 Titsingh, Isaac. (1834). Nihon Ōdai Ichiran; ou,  Annales des empereurs du Japon.  Paris: Royal Asiatic Society, Oriental Translation Fund of Great Britain and Ireland. OCLC 5850691.
 Totman, Conrad. (1967). Politics in the Tokugawa Bakufu, 1600–1843. Cambridge: Harvard University Press. OCLC 279623

1641 births
1680 deaths
17th-century shōguns
Tokugawa shōguns
Tokugawa clan
Child monarchs from Asia
People of Edo-period Japan